Henri Bonzano (30 October 1903 – 23 November 1995) was a French rower. He competed at the 1924 Summer Olympics   (Men's Coxless Fours, 4 place) and the 1928 Summer Olympics (DNS h2 r3/5). Brother of Albert Bonzano. Club Société Nautique de la Marne.

References

External links
 

1903 births
1995 deaths
French male rowers
Olympic rowers of France
Rowers at the 1924 Summer Olympics
Rowers at the 1928 Summer Olympics
Place of birth missing